This is a list of foreign ministers of Panama from 1945 to the present day.

1941–1944: Octavio Fábrega López
1945–1947: Horacio F. Alfaro
1947–1948: Mario de Diego
1948............ Ernesto Jaén Guardia
1948–1949: Ignacio Carlos Molino de Diego
1949............ Samuel Lewis Arango
1949............ Guillermo Méndez Pereira
1949–1951: Carlos N. Brin
1951–1952: Ignacio Carlos Molino de Diego
1952–1955: José Ramón Guizado
1955............ Octavio Fábrega López
1955............ Ricardo Arias
1955–1956: Alberto A. Boyd
1956–1958: Aquilino Boyd
1958–1960: Miguel J. Moreno
1960–1964: Galileo Solís
1964–1968: Fernando Eleta Almarán
1968–1969: Carlos Alfredo López Guevara
1969............ Nander Antberto Pitty Velásquez
1969–1976: Juan Antonio Tack
1976–1977: Aquilino Boyd
1977–1978: Nicolás González Revilla
1978–1981: Carlos Ozores Typaldos
1981–1982: Jorge Illueca
1982–1983: Juan José Amado
1983–1984: Oydén Ortega Durán
1984–1985: Fernando Cardoze
1985–1988: Jorge Abadía Arias
1988–1989: Jorge Eduardo Ritter
1989............ Gustavo R. González
1989............ Leonardo Kam
1989–1993: Julio Linares
1993–1994: José Raúl Mulino
1994–1996: Gabriel Lewis Galindo
1996–1998: Ricardo Alberto Arias
1998–1999: Jorge Eduardo Ritter
1999–2003: José Miguel Alemán
2003–2004: Harmodio Arias Cerjack
2004–2009: Samuel Lewis Navarro
2009–2011: Juan Carlos Varela
2011–2012: Roberto Henríquez
2012............ Francisco Álvarez De Soto 
2012–2013: Rómulo Roux
2013–2014: Fernando Núñez Fábrega
2014............ Francisco Álvarez De Soto
2014–2019: Isabel Saint Malo
2019–2020: Alejandro Ferrer López
2020–2022: Erika Mouynes
2022-present: Janaina Tewaney

Sources
Rulers.org – Foreign ministers L–R

Foreign
Foreign Ministers
Politicians
Foreign Ministers of Panama